Wolf Heinrich Friedrich Karl Graf von Baudissin (30 January 1789 – 4 April 1878) was a German diplomat, writer, and translator.

Born in Rantzau, Holstein, in 1810 Baudissin entered the diplomatic service of the Danish government serving as secretary of legation successively in Stockholm, Vienna, and Paris.  After 1827, he lived and worked in Dresden.  There he collaborated on translations of William Shakespeare with August Wilhelm Schlegel, Ludwig Tieck and Dorothea Tieck.  Independently, he translated Molière, Carlo Goldoni, Carlo Gozzi, and others.

Translations
Wirnt von Grafenberg, Wigalois.
Hartmann von Aue, Iwein, 1845.
Ben Jonson und seine Schule (Ben Jonson and his school, selected works and contextual materials), 1836.
Molière, Complete Comedies, 1865-1867.
William Shakespeare translations he contributed to:
All's Well That Ends Well
Antony and Cleopatra
Comedy of Errors
The Merry Wives of Windsor
King Lear
Henry VIII
Love's Labor's Lost
Measure for Measure
Othello
Taming of the Shrew
Titus Andronicus
Troilus and Cressida
Much Ado about Nothing

Notes

References

External links
Baudissin at Project Gutenberg 

1789 births
1878 deaths
German diplomats
Counts of Germany
Wolf Heinrich Graf von
English–German translators
German translators
Translators of William Shakespeare
German male dramatists and playwrights
19th-century German dramatists and playwrights
19th-century German male writers
19th-century German writers
German male poets